Australian Independent School Indonesia (AIS Indonesia), formerly the Australian International School-Indonesia, is a private international school that offers an Australian Curriculum pre-school and K-12 education located in three separate campuses in Indonesia.

Established in 1996, the school delivers a pre-school, primary school and secondary school education from its facilities in Pejaten Barat, that also incorporate the old secondary school campus. From its Bali campus, the school delivers a complete pre-school and K-12 education.  

The school was granted "World School" status by the International Baccalaureate Organization (IBO) and offers the senior IB Diploma Programme at both the Pejaten and Bali campuses. In 2015, AIS Indonesia was fully accredited with the Council of International Schools (CIS).

History
AIS Indonesia was founded in 1996 in response to a demand for inclusive education within the international schools in Indonesia. Prior to the formation of AIS, children with special educational needs were not accepted by any international school in Jakarta. With the involvement and support of professional educators, diplomatic and commercial representatives as well as a group of parents, the school opened on 15 July 1996 with an enrolment of eleven students. The Bali campus began operation in 1998 in Kerobokan and, in 2018, moved to a new campus in the nearby Imam Bonjol area.  The school has also recently completed an exciting campus redevelopment project on land opposite the existing Secondary Campus in Jakarta, allowing all year levels from Preschool to Year 12 to study together on one site in purpose-built, contemporary and innovative learning spaces. These building projects will significantly increase AIS Indonesia's enrolment capacity. 

, the school includes students from over 25 nationalities and offers Preschool to Year 12 classes with special education for students with learning support needs, limited English language proficiency or physical disabilities. 

In 2014 the school changed its name from "Australian International School" to "Australian Independent School" to comply with the Indonesian government's regulations prohibiting the use of the word 'international' in school names.

Campuses
Jakarta
 AIS Jakarta - Pejaten Barat, South Jakarta

Bali
AIS Bali - Imam Bonjol, Denpasar

Principals

See also
 Australia–Indonesia relations

References

External links

  wartaekonomi.co.id/read200329/ais-bali-tempati-kampus-baru.html

Australian international schools in Indonesia
International schools in Jakarta
South Jakarta
Schools in Bali
1996 establishments in Indonesia
Educational institutions established in 1996